Khagrabari is a census town in the Cooch Behar II CD block in the Cooch Behar Sadar subdivision of the Cooch Behar district in the Indian state of West Bengal.

Geography

Location

Area overview
The map alongside shows the north-central part of the district. It has the highest level of urbanisation in an overwhelming rural district. 22.08% of the population of the Cooch Behar Sadar subdivision lives in the urban areas and 77.92% lives in the rural areas. The entire district forms the flat alluvial flood plains of mighty rivers.
 
Note: The map alongside presents some of the notable locations in the subdivision. All places marked in the map are linked in the larger full screen map.

Demographics
As per the 2011 Census of India, Khagrabari had a total population of 23,122.  There were 11,733 (51%) males and 11,389 (49%) females. There were 2,110 persons in the age range of 0 to 6 years. The total number of literate people in Khagrabari was 18,606 (88.55% of the population over 6 years).

 India census, Khagrabari had a population of 19,762. Males constitute 51% of the population and females 49%. Khagrabari has an average literacy rate of 76%, higher than the national average of 59.5%: male literacy is 82%, and female literacy is 71%. In Khagrabari, 11% of the population is under 6 years of age.

Infrastructure
According to the District Census Handbook 2011, Koch Bihar, Khagrabari covered an area of 5.69 km2. Among the civic amenities, it had 35 km roads with open drains, the protected water supply involved  overhead tank, tap water from treated sources.. It had 2,246  electric connections. Among the medical facilities it had 1 nursing home, 7 medicine shop. Among the educational facilities it had 14  primary schools, 3 middle schools, 3 secondary schools, 2 senior secondary schools, the nearest general degree college at Cooch Behar 5 km away. It had 1 non-formal education centre (Sarva Shiksha Abhiyan). Among the social, recreational and cultural facilities it had 1 cinema theatre, 3 auditorium/ community halls, 1 public library and 1 reading room. Three important commodities it produced were rice, fodder, atta. It had the branch offices of 1 nationalised bank, 1 non- agricultural credit society.

References

Cities and towns in Cooch Behar district